Bustleton may refer to:

Bustleton, New Jersey, United States
Bustleton, Philadelphia, Pennsylvania, United States